Shuangfupu is a town in Ningxiang City, Hunan Province, China. It is surrounded by Laoliangcang Town and Hengshi on the west, Yujia'ao Township on the north, Dachengqiao Town and Zifu on the east, and Huitang Town on the south.

Administrative division
The town is divided into seven villages and one community: 
 Shuangfupu Community
 Quanjing
 Huilongshan 
 Maitian
 Yuxin
 Hexuan
 Sujiang
 Shuangming Village

Geography
The Wei River is known as "Mother River", a tributary of the Xiang River, it flows through the town.

Jindong Reservoir is the largest reservoir and largest water body in the town.

Economy
The region abounds with iron.

Prunus mume, tobacco and watermelon are important to the economy.

There are several shoe enterprises in the town, such as Jiemei, Luge and Fuqiang.

Education
There is one senior high school located with the town limits: Ningxiang Fifth Senior High School.

Culture
Huaguxi is the most influential local theater.

Transportation

The Provincial Highway S209 from Yutan Subdistrict, running through Shuangfupu Town, Hengshi Town, Laoliangcang Town, Liushahe Town, Qingshanqiao Town to Loudi City.

The Provincial Highway S224 runs northeast to Meitanba.

The County Road X091 passes across the town east to west.

The County Road X097 travels south to Huitang.

Attractions

Baiyun Temple is a Buddhist temple on Huilong Mountain built during the Tang dynasty and later destroyed and rebuilt several times. The temple is where Mao Zedong carried out social research in 1917. Gautama Buddha is the main target of worship along with the Three Saints of the West, the Ksitigarbha, and the twenty four Heavens.

References

Divisions of Ningxiang
Ningxiang